Jack Pennington (born September 3, 1953) is a dirt Late Model driver from Augusta, Georgia.

He was an ace in late model dirt track racing before he moved up to the Busch Series in 1989 making six starts, finishing with 2 top tens. He made his Winston Cup debut late in 1989, driving two races that year. He then ran fourteen races in 1990 in the No. 47 Oldsmobile Cutlass Supreme for Close Racing, he led in the 1990 Daytona 500 at one point with leading 6 laps in that race. He was second in the 1990 Rookie of the Year standings in controversial fashion (because the winner was posthumously awarded after being killed in a drunken driving incident returning home from the September North Wilkesboro round; NASCAR has since added a disciplinary rule that requires drivers to finish the season in good standing, which Pennington would have won the title under current rules). He never raced in NASCAR again after that year, returning to the Georgia dirt Late Model circuit, winning often over 20 features each year for the next decade.

Career award
He was inducted in the National Dirt Late Model Hall of Fame in 2006.

References

External links 

1953 births
Living people
NASCAR drivers
Racing drivers from Georgia (U.S. state)
Sportspeople from Augusta, Georgia